Zeatrophon pulcherrimus is a species of small predatory sea snail, a marine gastropod mollusc in the family Muricidae, the rock snails or murex snails.

References

 Finlay H.J. (1930) Additions to the Recent fauna of New Zealand. No. 3. Transactions and Proceedings of the Royal Society of New Zealand 61: 222-247
 Powell A W B, New Zealand Mollusca, William Collins Publishers Ltd, Auckland, New Zealand 1979 
 Beu, A.G. 2011 Marine Molluscs of oxygen isotope stages of the last 2 million years in New Zealand. Part 4. Gastropoda (Ptenoglossa, Neogastropoda, Heterobranchia). Journal of the Royal Society of New Zealand 41, 1–153.

Gastropods of New Zealand
Pagodulinae
Gastropods described in 1930
Taxa named by Harold John Finlay